Good Hope or Goodhope can refer to:

Locations

United States
Good Hope, Alabama
Goodhope Bay, a bay in Alaska
Goodhope River, a river in Alaska
Good Hope, California
Good Hope, Georgia
Good Hope, Illinois
Good Hope, Louisiana
Good Hope, Mississippi (disambiguation)
Good Hope, Ohio
Good Hope, Washington, D.C., a neighborhood
Goodhope, West Virginia
Good Hope, Wisconsin
Good Hope, U.S. Virgin Islands

Elsewhere
Cape of Good Hope, South Africa
Good Hope, Botswana
Good Hope, Dominica
Goodhope, Buffalo City, a village in Buffalo City Metropolitan Municipality, Eastern Cape, South Africa
Good Hope, Guyana, a village in Guyana
Good Hope School, Hong Kong
Mount Good Hope, officially "Good Hope Mountain", in BC, Canada

Vessels
HMS Good Hope, several ships of the British Royal Navy, including:
 HMS Good Hope (1901)

See also
 Cape of Good Hope (disambiguation)
 Order of Good Hope, a knighthood order
 The Good Hope, a 1900/1901 play by Herman Heijermans
 The Good Hope (novel), a 1964 novel by William Heinesen